Imar or Karamli is a village that is, de facto, in the Martakert Province of the breakaway Republic of Artsakh; de jure, it is in the Kalbajar District of Azerbaijan, in the disputed region of Nagorno-Karabakh. The village had an Azerbaijani-majority population prior to their expulsion during the Nagorno-Karabakh war.

Toponymy 
The village was previously known as Imarat Garvand.

History 
During the Soviet period, the village was part of the Mardakert District of the Nagorno-Karabakh Autonomous Oblast.

The human rights organisation Memorial reported about the forced expulsion of the Azerbaijani inhabitants of the village in 1991, along with several other Azerbaijani villages around the area. The village was fully burned to the ground by Armenian forces.

References

External links 
 

Populated places in Martakert Province
Populated places in Kalbajar District